This is a list of hospitals in Oman. There are 59 hospitals in Oman and 897 medical centres, dispensaries, and clinics. Only 10 hospitals are private, and the rest are government hospitals. Prior to 1958, there were only two hospitals in Oman, the Knox Memorial Hospital and another hospital partially financed by the Sultan of Oman. The Ministry of Health was formed by royal decree of Sultan Qaboos bin Said on August 22, 1970. This decree established standards, policies and funding for expansion of public healthcare facilities in Oman. By 2008, there 58 hospitals, including 49 hospitals managed by the Ministry of Public Health, four private hospitals, three hospitals in the Ministry of Defence, one university hospital, and one hospital for the Royal Oman Police. The Ministry of Health also manages 167 health centers.

Hospitals in Muscat Governorate 

The following hospitals are located in the Muscat Governorate. The locations within the Governorate are indicated when known:

Hospitals in the rest of Oman 

The following hospitals and clinics are located outside of the Muscat Governorate:

Medical Centers and Clinics
The following medical centers and clinics (not hospitals) are located in Oman:
Advanced Medical Center, Qurumhills, Muscat
Al Hayat Polyclinic, Sohar
Al Hayat Polyclinic, Al Hail
Al Hayat Polyclinic, Al Ghubra
Al Amal Medical Centre, Al-Khuwair
Al Amal Medical Centre, Al-Lhoud
Al Amal Medical Centre, Ruwi
Aster Al Raffah Polyclinic, Amerat, Muscat
 Aster Al Raffah Polyclinic, Al-Khoudh, Muscat
 Aster Al Raffah Polyclinic, Mabela, Muscat
 Aster Al Raffah Polyclinic, Ruwi, Muscat
 Aster Al Raffah Medical Centre, Sohar
 Aster Al Raffah Medical Centre, Liwa
 American Specialty Clinics Center, Medical and dental clinics, Al Qurm St, Muscat
 Advanced Fertility & Genetics Center LLC, Al-Khuwair
 Al Bushra Medical Specialty Complex, Al-Azaiba
 Al Burooj Medical Center, Barkha, Oman
 Al Hakeem Fertility Mother and Child Care Centre, Al-Khuwair
 Happy Kid Clinic, Qurum, suburb of Muscat
 Hatat Polyclinic (Hatat Complex, Wadi Adai and Azaibha)
 International Urology and Specialized Surgery Center
 Lama Polyclinic, Ruwi and Al-Khuwair
 Magreb Eye and Ear Clinic
 Medical Vision Specialty Center, Qurum
 New Hope Medical Center, Qurum (Jordanian expertise)
 Noor al Shifa Medical Complex, Thumarit
 Sagar Polyclinic, Al-Khuwair, Muscat
 Starcare Group of Hospitals, Sharja
Liya Medical Complex,  Salalah, Dhofar

See also

 Health in Oman
 Healthcare in Oman

References

Bibliography
 

Oman
Hospitals

Oman